Kharchikha is a rural locality (a village) in Izboishchskoye Rural Settlement, Chagodoshchensky District, Vologda Oblast, Russia. The population was 8 as of 2002.

Geography 
Klypino is the nearest rural locality.

References 

Rural localities in Chagodoshchensky District